Varbergs GIF FK is a Swedish football club located in Varberg.

Background
Varbergs Gymnastik- och Idrottsförening was formed on 28 May 1905 and shortly afterwards included football in their programme. In the same year the club became founder members of the Hallands Idrottsförbund (Halland Sports Federation) at the invitation of  IF Kamraterna, Halmstad.

In the 1940s, the club also played bandy.

Varbergs GIF FF were declared bankrupt in December 2007 when their tax liabilities could not be met. As a consequence the club dropped out of Division 4 Halland and reformed in the bottom tier in Division 6 Halland Norra.

Varbergs GIF FK currently plays in Division 2 Västra Götaland which is the fourth tier of Swedish football. They play their home matches at the Påskbergsvallen in Varberg.

The club is affiliated to Hallands Fotbollförbund. Varbergs GIF have competed in the Svenska Cupen on 24 occasions and have played 40 matches in the competition.

Season to season

Footnotes

External links
 Varbergs GIF FK – Official website

Football clubs in Halland County
Association football clubs established in 1905
Bandy clubs established in 1905
1905 establishments in Sweden